Facilina is a genus of flies in the family Pyrgotidae.

Species 
F. campbelli Paramonov, 1958
F. commoni Paramonov, 1958
F. tertia Paramonov, 1958

References

External links

Pyrgotidae
Diptera of Australasia